The Turahiya are a Hindu caste found in the state of Uttar Pradesh in India.

Origin

The Turahiya are a sub-group within the Nishadha, fishermen community caste of India. According to the traditions of the community, aside from fishing, they were traditionally employed to play musical instruments, known as a turahi. Over time they formed a distinct endogamous group within the fishing community. They are found mainly in Uttar Pradesh, principally in the western districts.

Present circumstances

The Turahiya are still employed to play the turahi and other musical instruments on several occasions. However, the majority of the Turahiya are landless agricultural labourers. The Turahiya remain one of the most marginalised communities in the Uttar Pradesh.  They live in multi-caste villages, but occupy their own distinct quarters. They often suffer from societal discrimination. Each of their settlement contains an informal caste council, known as a biradari panchayat.  The panchayat acts as instrument of social control, dealing with issues such as divorce and adultery.

The Turahiya were recorded as a Scheduled Caste in Uttar Pradesh in the 2011 Census of India. Their population was then 28,055.

References

Fishing castes
Scheduled Castes of Uttar Pradesh